Alfred Burges (1796–1886) was a British civil engineer.  He was apprenticed to the civil engineer James Walker, and in turn trained several other engineers including Sir Joseph Bazalgette.

Walker and Burges were responsible for railways, bridges and many marine works, including 21 lighthouses, Surrey Commercial Docks, the Junction Dock at Hull, and the Bedford Levels. Their firm is noted in many documents as Messrs. Walker & Burgess, engineers of Limehouse, with his last name being almost always spelt in this way.

He died at Worthing on 12 March 1886, and is buried at West Norwood Cemetery. He left a fortune of £113,000.(£ in  adjusted for inflation)

His son William (1827–1881) was an influential architect.

References

Sources
 
 

British civil engineers
1796 births
1886 deaths
Burials at West Norwood Cemetery